Gringo is a term used to describe a foreigner from the perspective of Spanish and Portuguese-speaking countries in Latin America.

Gringo may also refer to:

Music
Gringo Records, an independent label based in Nottingham, England
Gringo (album), a 2009 album by the Circus Devils
"Gringo" (Sabrina song), 1989
"Gringo" (Shatta Wale song), 2018
"Gringo", a 2006 song by Akon from Konvicted
"Gringo", a song by Roby Benvenuto
"Gringo", a song by Little Feat from Hoy-Hoy!

Fiction
Gringo (play), a 1922 play by Sophie Treadwell
Gringo (manga), a 1987 manga
Gringos (novel), a 1991 novel by Charles Portis
El Gringo, a western novel about Morgan Kane
Duello nel Texas or Gringo, a 1963 Italian/Spanish spaghetti western
El Gringo, a 2012 American action thriller film
Gringo (2018 film), an American crime comedy film
Los gringos, an animated short, an official selection for the 2000 Sundance Film Festival
"The Gringos", an episode of The O.C.

Places
Gringo, Pennsylvania, an unincorporated community
Gringo Gulch, a valley in Arizona

Nickname and stage name
José Antonio Castro (born 1980), Mexican footballer
Gabriel Heinze (born 1978), Argentine former footballer
Gregorio Honasan (born 1948), Filipino politician
Mr Percival (born 1976), Australian pelican and film actor
Juan Schiaretti (born 1949), Argentine politician
John Spacely (died 1993), American actor and hustler
Miguel "El Gringo" Villarreal (died 2013), alleged drug trafficker and a leader of the Gulf Cartel Mexican drug trafficking organization
Gringo (musician), Samuel Gerena, member of the reggaeton duo Baby Rasta & Gringo
El Gringo (musician), Shawn Kiehne (born 1976), an American Latin musician

Other uses
Marseille turn or Gringo, a football skill 
Gringo: The Dangerous Life of John McAfee, a documentary about John McAfee
Gringas, a Mexican dish

See also

Lists of people by nickname